Michael Ball (born 1943) is a Canadian stage and television actor.

Life and career
Ball was born in 1943, in Ottawa, Ontario and raised in Victoria, British Columbia. There he attended the Oak Bay High School, where discovered theatre and decided to become an actor. From 1961 to 1964, he studied at the National Theatre School of Canada in Montreal, Quebec.

He had a wide career in theatre and television. He has played in many stage productions at the Shaw Festival in Niagara-on-the-Lake, Ontario, Canada.

He lives in Niagara-on-the-Lake.

Personal life
Ball is married to Wendy Thatcher, an actress.

Filmography

Television

References

External links
 About the Artists
 

1943 births
Canadian male stage actors
Canadian male television actors
Living people
Male actors from Ottawa
National Theatre School of Canada alumni
20th-century Canadian male actors
21st-century Canadian male actors